René Mugica (8 August 1909 – 3 May 1998) was an Argentine actor, film director and screenwriter. He appeared in 13 films between 1940 and 1953. He also directed ten films between 1961 and 1971.

Selected filmography

Actor
 The Gaucho Priest (1941)
 La Guerra Gaucha (1942)
 El Fin de la noche (1944)
 His Best Student (1944)
 Savage Pampas (1945)
 Where Words Fail (1946)

Director
 That Forward Center Died at Dawn (El centroforward murió al amanecer) - 1961
 Man on Pink Corner (Hombre de la Esquina Rosada) - 1962
 Rata de puerto - 1963
 La Murga - 1963
 Demon in the Blood (El demonio en la sangre) - 1964
 El octavo infierno - 1964
 The Amphitheatre (El Reñidero) - 1965
 Viaje de una noche de verano - 1965
 La buena vida - 1966
 Bajo el signo de la patria - 1971

External links

Argentine male film actors
Argentine film directors
Male screenwriters
1909 births
1998 deaths
Burials at La Chacarita Cemetery
20th-century Argentine male actors
20th-century Argentine screenwriters
20th-century Argentine male writers